The women's 800 metres event at the 1994 World Junior Championships in Athletics was held in Lisbon, Portugal, at Estádio Universitário de Lisboa on 20, 21 and 22 July.

Medalists

Results

Final
22 July

Semifinals
21 July

Semifinal 1

Semifinal 2

Heats
20 July

Heat 1

Heat 2

Heat 3

Heat 4

Heat 5

Participation
According to an unofficial count, 39 athletes from 29 countries participated in the event.

References

800 metres
800 metres at the World Athletics U20 Championships